Colli Albani is a station on the Rome Metro. It is on Line A and is located in Largo dei Colli Albani, between the Furio Camillo and Arco di Travertino stations.

References

Rome Metro Line A stations
Railway stations opened in 1980
1980 establishments in Italy
Rome Q. VIII Tuscolano
Rome Q. IX Appio-Latino
Railway stations in Italy opened in the 20th century